Francis Malet (born 26 March 1855, date of death unknown) was a New Zealand cricketer. He played in six first-class matches for Canterbury in 1883/84.

See also
 List of Canterbury representative cricketers

References

External links
 

1855 births
Year of death missing
New Zealand cricketers
Canterbury cricketers